Clare Edgar Mapledoram (March 10, 1903 – October 9, 1983) was a politician in Ontario, Canada. He was a Progressive Conservative member of the Legislative Assembly of Ontario from 1951 to 1959 who represented the northern Ontario riding of Fort William. He was a cabinet minister in the government of Leslie Frost.

Background
Mapledoram was born in Fort William, Ontario, the son of William James Mapledoram. In 1927, he married Mary Dorica. Mapledoram was a personnel manager for the Great Lakes Paper Company. He and his wife Mary raised four children, three sons and a daughter. He died in Thunder Bay at the age of 80.

Politics
Mapledoram served as reeve for Neebing Township from 1947 to 1951. He also served as president of the local Chamber of Commerce.

In the 1951 provincial election, he ran as the Progressive Conservative candidate in the riding of Fort William. He defeated Liberal incumbent Charlie Cox by 752 votes. He was re-elected in 1955.

He was Minister of Lands and Forests in the provincial cabinet from 1954 to 1958, but resigned from cabinet after he was implicated in the Northern Ontario Natural Gas scandal. He was defeated in the 1959 election by Liberal John Chapple.

Cabinet posts

References

External links 
 

1903 births
1983 deaths
Mayors of places in Ontario
Members of the Executive Council of Ontario
Progressive Conservative Party of Ontario MPPs
Politicians from Thunder Bay